A by-election was held for the New South Wales Legislative Assembly electorate of Redfern on 9 March 1886 because Arthur Renwick was appointed Minister of Public Instruction in the ministry of Sir Patrick Jennings. Under the constitution, ministers in the Legislative Assembly were required to resign to recontest their seats in a by-election when appointed. Such ministerial by-elections were usually uncontested and on this occasion a poll was required for Redfern and Bathurst where Francis Suttor was easily re-elected. The 7 other ministers were re-elected unopposed.

Dates

Result

Arthur Renwick was appointed Minister of Public Instruction in the Jennings ministry.

See also
Electoral results for the district of Redfern
List of New South Wales state by-elections

References

1886 elections in Australia
New South Wales state by-elections
1880s in New South Wales